Matrix metalloproteinase-21 (MMP-21) is an enzyme that in humans is encoded by the MMP21 gene.

Function 

This gene encodes a member of the matrix metalloproteinase family. Proteins in this family are involved in the breakdown of extracellular matrix for both normal physiological processes, such as embryonic development, reproduction, and tissue remodeling, and disease processes, such as asthma and metastasis. The encoded protein may play an important role in embryogenesis, particularly in neuronal cells, as well as in lymphocyte development and survival.

References

Further reading

External links
 The MEROPS online database for peptidases and their inhibitors: M10.026

Matrix metalloproteinases
EC 3.4.24